Georges Polny (born 3 February 1943) is a French former professional football player and manager. As a player, he was a defender. He most notably played for Saint-Étienne from 1960 to 1972, where he won thirteen trophies, including five Division 1 league titles. Later in his career, he played for Monaco and Rouen, before his retirement in 1977. He went on to coach Beauvais from 1977 to 1979 and Poitiers from 1979 to 1980.

Honours 
Saint-Étienne

 Division 1: 1963–64, 1966–67, 1967–68, 1968–69, 1969–70
 Division 2: 1962–63
 Coupe de France: 1961–62, 1967–68, 1969–70
 Challenge des Champions: 1962, 1967, 1968, 1969

Monaco

 Coupe de France runner-up: 1973–74

References 

1943 births
Living people
Sportspeople from Tarn (department)
French footballers
Association football defenders
AS Saint-Étienne players
AS Monaco FC players
FC Rouen players
Ligue 1 players
Ligue 2 players
French football managers
AS Beauvais Oise managers
Stade Poitevin FC managers

French Division 3 (1971–1993) managers
French Division 4 (1978–1993) managers
Footballers from Occitania (administrative region)